Berlanti Productions is an American film and television production company founded by screenwriter, producer and filmmaker Greg Berlanti and producer Mickey Liddell.

History

The company was founded in 2000 as Berlanti-Liddell Productions by screenwriter, producer and filmmaker Greg Berlanti and producer Mickey Liddell.

In March 2003, the company signed a three-year deal with Warner Bros. Television. In February 2006, the company signed a three-year overall deal with Touchstone Television. In August 2006, Liddell left the company, and the company was renamed to Berlanti Television. In July 2008, the company re-signed its overall deal with ABC Studios (formally Touchstone Television) for an additional five-year deal. In March 2011, the company signed a four-year overall deal with Warner Bros. Television, ending its overall deal with ABC Studios two years early. The company also changed its name to Berlanti Productions to reflect its television and film divisions combining together.

In February 2014, Sarah Schechter became the company's president, overseeing the development and production of the company's television and film projects. Before joining the company, Schechter was a senior production vice president at Warner Bros.

In June 2018, the company entered a six-year overall development and production deal with Warner Bros. Television Group until 2024.

In February 2020, David Madden joined the company as its new president, taking over from the company's former president Sarah Schechter. Schechter moved to the newly created positions of chairwoman and partner. Before joining the company, Madden was the former president of AMC Networks and Fox Broadcasting Company.

In August 2021, Dannah Shinder joined the company as executive vice president of television. Before joining the company, Shinder was senior vice president of television at Elizabeth Banks' Brownstone Productions. In January 2022, Suzanne Gomez joined the company as chief marketing officer, and head of talent relations. Gomez was previously senior vice president of publicity at The CW, a position she held since the inception of the network in 2006.

In January 2023, the company signed a four-year exclusive overall deal for Berlanti Productions to remain at the Warner Bros. studio for its television operations into the year 2027 with Warner Bros. Television Group.

Filmography

Film

In Production
 Alice + Freda Forever (with Sidney Kimmel Entertainment and Amazon Studios)
 Booster Gold (with DC Films)
 Little Shop Of Horrors (with Marc Platt Productions)
 The Editor (with Fox 2000 Pictures)
 Be More Chill (with 21 Laps Entertainment)
 Untitled Rock Hudson project (with Marsh Productions & Entertainment Inc. and Universal Pictures)
 Insane (with Entertainment One)
 The Gentleman's Guide to Vice and Virtue
 Songs In Ursa Major (with Village Roadshow Pictures)
 We Were There, Too
 Untitled Free Guy sequel (with 21 Laps Entertainment, Maximum Effort, Lit Entertainment Group, and TSG Entertainment)

Television

Current

Former
{| class="wikitable sortable"
|-
! Year
! Title
! Network
! class="unsortable"| Notes
! class="unsortable"| 
|-
| 2002–2006
| Everwood
| rowspan="2" | The WB
| with Warner Bros. Television
| rowspan="5" |
|-
| 2004–2005
| Jack & Bobby
| with Shoe Money Productions and Warner Bros. Television
|-
| 2006–2011
| Brothers & Sisters
| rowspan="4" | ABC
| with After Portsmouth Productions, Touchstone Television (season 1), and ABC Studios (seasons 2–5)
|-
| 2007–2009
| Dirty Sexy Money| rowspan="2" | with ABC Studios
|-
| 2008–2009
| Eli Stone|-
| 2010–2011
| No Ordinary Family| with Oh That Gus!, Inc. and ABC Studios
| 
|-
| 2012
| Political Animals| USA Network
| with Laurence Mark Productions and Warner Horizon Television
| 
|-
| 2012–2020
| Arrow| The CW
| with DC Entertainment and Warner Bros. Television
| 
|-
| 2013
| Golden Boy| CBS
| with Nicholas Wootton Productions and Warner Bros. Television
| 
|-
| 2013–2014
| The Tomorrow People| The CW
| with FremantleMedia North America, CBS Television Studios, and Warner Bros. Television
| 
|-
| 2014–2016
| The Mysteries of Laura| NBC
| with Jeff Rake Productions, Kapital Entertainment, New Media Vision, and Warner Bros. Television
| 
|-
| 2015–2020
| Blindspot| NBC
| with Quinn's House and Warner Bros. Television
| 
|-
| 2015–2021
| Supergirl| CBSThe CW
| with DC Entertainment and Warner Bros. Television
| 
|-
| 2016–2022
| Legends of Tomorrow| The CW
| with DC Entertainment and Warner Bros. Television
| 
|-
| 2018
| Deception| ABC
| with VHPT Company and Warner Bros. Television
| 
|-
| 2018–2021
| Black Lightning| The CW
| with Akil Productions, DC Entertainment, and Warner Bros. Television
| 
|-
| 2018–2020
| God Friended Me| CBS
| with I Have an Idea! Entertainment, CBS Television Studios, and Warner Bros. Television
| 
|-
| 2018–2020
| Chilling Adventures of Sabrina| Netflix
| with Archie Comics, Muckle Man Productions (season 2), and Warner Bros. Television
| 
|-
| 2019
| The Red Line| CBS
| with Array Filmworks, Forward Movement, CBS Television Studios, and Warner Bros. Television
| 
|-
| 2019–2021
| Prodigal Son| FOX
| with Sklaverworth Productions, VHPT! Co., Warner Bros. Television, and Fox Entertainment
| 
|-
| 2019–2022
| Batwoman| The CW
| with DC Entertainment and Warner Bros. Television
| 
|-
| 2020–2022
| Stargirl| DC UniverseThe CW
| with Mad Ghost Productions, DC Entertainment, and Warner Bros. Television Studios
| 
|-
| 2020
| Katy Keene| The CW
| with Archie Comics, CBS Television Studios, and Warner Bros. Television
| 
|-
| 2020
| Helter Skelter: An American Myth| Epix
| with Rogue Atlas Productions and Warner Horizon Unscripted Television
| 
|-
| 2020
| Equal| HBO Max
| with Scout Productions, Raintree Ventures, That's Wonderful Productions, and Warner Horizon Unscripted Television
| 
|}

In Production
 Untitled Greg Berlanti project (with Brownstone Productions and Warner Bros. Television)
 Untitled Nkechi Carroll project (with Brownstone Productions and Warner Bros. Television)
 The Secret to a Good Marriage (with Quinn's House and Warner Bros. Television)
 3,000 Hours (with Good Company and Warner Bros. Television)
 TriBeCa (with Warner Bros. Television)
 Spoonbenders (with Warner Bros. Television)
 The Brides (with ABC Studios and Warner Bros. Television)
 Powerpuff (with Warner Bros. Television And Cartoon Network Studios)
 The Disasters (with 5 More Minutes Productions and Warner Bros. Television)
 Untitled Doris Day project (with Yes, Norman Productions and Warner Bros. Television)
 The Girls On The Bus (with My So-Called Company and Warner Bros. Television)
 Dead Boy Detectives (with Warner Bros. Television)
 Landing (with Warner Bros. Television)
 Justice U (with Warner Bros. Television)
 Found (with Rock My Soul Productions and Warner Bros. Television)

Web series

Berlanti-Schechter Films
Berlanti-Schechter Films was founded in 2020 by Greg Berlanti and Sarah Schechter, and is a subsidiary of Berlanti Productions. In July 2021, the company signed a first-look feature film deal at Netflix.

In Production
 The Sting (with Skydance Media)
 The Hunger'' (with Warner Bros. Pictures)

References

Mass media companies established in 2000
Film production companies of the United States
Television production companies of the United States